Hoseynabad-e Morad Khan (also Romanized as Ḩoseynābād-e Morād Khān; also known as Ḩoseynābād and Ḩoseynābād-e Morād ‘Alī Khān) is a village in Nehzatabad Rural District, in the Central District of Rudbar-e Jonubi County, Kerman Province, Iran. At the 2006 census, its population was 76, in 13 families.

References 

Populated places in Rudbar-e Jonubi County